The Nakajima LB-2 was a long-range, land-based bomber developed in Japan for use by the Imperial Japanese Navy. When rejected for military service, the sole prototype was converted into an airliner and, known as the Akatsuki-go (暁号 – "Dawn"), was operated by Manchukuo National Airways.

Development and design
Kenichi Mitsumara's design was inspired by the Douglas DC-2 that Nakajima was building at the time under licence; a conventional, low-wing cantilever monoplane powered by twin engines. Construction was of metal throughout, and the main units of the tailwheel undercarriage retracted into the engine nacelles. The bomb load was carried in an internal bay.

The prototype LB-2 was completed in March 1936. It was considered for production, along with the Mitsubishi G1M, but eventually both were rejected in favour of the Mitsubishi Ka-15, which would be produced as the G3M. Adapted for civil use, the LB-2 prototype's bomb bay was replaced with a fuel tank and a cabin for six passengers was fitted, with the bombardier's position in the nose converted to store luggage.

Operational history
The converted LB-2, now named Akatsuki-go, was delivered to Manchukuo National Airways in 1937, with it (and two Heinkel He 116s) intended to operate a service to the Soviet Union over the Tian Shan mountains. The outbreak of the Second Sino-Japanese War and the undeclared  Soviet–Japanese Border Wars which culminated in the Battle of Khalkhin Gol stopped these plans, however, and the Akatsuki-go was scrapped at Shenyang in 1941.

Specifications

Notes

References

LB-2
LB-2, Nakajima
Low-wing aircraft
Aircraft first flown in 1936
Twin piston-engined tractor aircraft